Vurra is a town in Uganda.

Location
The town is in the northwestern corner of Uganda, close to the international border with the Democratic Republic of the Congo (DRC). Vurra is in Arua District of the West Nile sub-region. The coordinates of Vurra are 2°53'11.0"N, 30°52'46.0"E (Latitude:2.886389; Longitude:30.879444).

Overview
Vurra is a small border town, sitting directly on the border with the DRC across from the town of Aru in the DRC. It is the southernmost point along the Vurra-Arua-Koboko-Oraba Road. Vurra is the birthplace of the Ugandan international long-distance champion athlete Dorcus Inzikuru.

Points of interest
 offices of Vurra Town Council
 headquarters of Vurra County
 Vurra central market

Notable people
Dorcus Inzikuru, athlete
 Dradiku Nyakuni samuel, canon and founder of Christ church ambala

References

External links
 UNRA Fails To Beat December Deadline for Vurra-Arua-Koboko-Oraba Road

Populated places in Northern Region, Uganda
Democratic Republic of the Congo–Uganda border crossings
Arua District
West Nile sub-region